is a Japanese professional sumo wrestler from Aomori Prefecture. He debuted in sumo wrestling in January 2013 and made his top makuuchi debut in May 2017.  His highest rank has been komusubi, and he has won three special prizes for Fighting Spirit, one for Outstanding Performance and two kinboshi for defeating yokozuna. He wrestles for Ōnomatsu stable.

Background
Fumiya Utetsu was born in Nakadomari, a small town on the northern tip of Honshu. Growing up he enjoyed skiing and snowboarding. He became interested in sumo wrestling at the age of five after encouragement from his grandfather, and began to train at his local gym. In an interview with NHK he said, "I thought that wrestlers were cool". Whilst attending Nakasato Elementary School, Nakasato Junior High School and Sanbongi Agricultural High School, he won numerous local and regional sumo tournaments. In November 2012 he dropped out of high school to pursue a career in sumo.

He joined the Ōnomatsu stable and adopted the ring name (shikona) of Ōnoshō.

Career

Early career
Ōnoshō made his professional debut at the age of sixteen in the Osaka tournament in March 2013. He quickly moved through the lower divisions and reached the third highest makushita division in November of the same year. Seven consecutive winning records (kachi-koshi) saw him promoted to the second division (jūryō) in January 2015. Competing against more experienced opponents he made relatively little impact in his first jūryō run but looked to be maintaining his place in the division before sustaining an injury in November 2015. A 5–10 record in March 2016 saw him relegated for the first time in his wrestling career. He rebounded by winning all seven of his bouts in makushita in May and was promoted back up to the second division despite losing in a play-off for the championship to Oyanagi. Over the next six tournaments, Ōnoshō worked his way up the ranks of jūryō and a 9–6 result in March 2017 clinched his promotion to the top division (makuuchi) for the first time.

Makuuchi career

In his first tournament in the top division Ōnoshō was assigned the rank of maegashira 14. He recovered from an opening day defeat to Daishōmaru to record a 10–5 result, with his defeated opponents including other promising young wrestlers such as Hokutofuji, Ishiura and Kagayaki, as well as more experienced foes such as Kaisei and Myōgiryū. His efforts saw him being rewarded with the special prize for Fighting Spirit as well as promotion to maegashira 6 for the next tournament. In the following July tournament he was one of only two wrestlers to defeat the eventual runner-up Aoiyama, and he finished with another 10–5 record. In September 2017 at the rank of maegashira 3 he earned a kinboshi by defeating the eventual yusho winner Harumafuji on his way to a second Fighting Spirit prize and a third 10–5 record. He thereby became the first rikishi since the 38th yokozuna Terukuni (and thus the first wrestler in the era of the six tournament system) to achieve double-digit records in each of his first three makuuchi tournaments. He was promoted to the san'yaku ranks at komusubi for the November 2017 tournament, becoming only the second wrestler ever from his stable after Wakakōyū in 2012 to achieve this. After losing six of his first seven bouts in November, he recovered in the second week of the tournament and secured his majority of wins on the final day. He withdrew from the January 2018 tournament on Day 10 with a posterior cruciate ligament injury to the right knee. The injury kept him out of the following tournament in March and saw him relegated to jūryō. In May, however, he returned to action and secured his promotion back to the top division as he won the jūryō title with a 12–3 record. He won his third Fighting Spirit prize after an 11–4 record at maegashira 13 in November 2018. This performance saw him being promoted to east maegashira 6 for the next tournament in which he got an 8-7 score. He had an unremarkable 2019, not being able to mount a serious challenge for promotion back to san'yaku. In March 2020 he earned his second kinboshi  by defeating Hakuhō for the first time. He finished the tournament with a 9–6 record and the Outstanding Performance prize.

Ōnoshō withdrew from the May 2022 tournament after fracturing his left rib in his Day 5 loss to Takakeishō. In the January 2023 tournament he led the field outright on Day 12 with ten wins and two losses. However he had a disappointing end to the tournament, losing his last three matches and missing out on the Fighting Spirit Prize on Day 15 after being disqualified for a hair-pull on Hōshōryū.

Fighting style
Ōnoshō has a preference for oshi techniques (pushing and thrusting) rather than grasping his opponent's mawashi or belt. His most common kimarite or winning move is oshidashi, the push-out. His style is regarded as aggressive, with him looking to move forward and finish the match as quickly as possible. However since his 2018 injury layoff he has sought to add more variety to his technique.

Career record

See also
Glossary of sumo terms
List of active sumo wrestlers
List of active gold star earners
List of komusubi
List of sumo tournament second division champions
Active special prize winners

References

External links

1996 births
Living people
Japanese sumo wrestlers
Sumo people from Aomori Prefecture
Komusubi